The Koochiching State Forest is a state forest located near International Falls in Itasca, Koochiching, and Saint Louis counties, Minnesota. The forest borders the Pine Island State Forest to the west, the Big Fork State Forest and George Washington State Forest to the south, the Nett Lake Indian Reservation and the Kabetogama State Forest to the east. A leg of the forest touches Rainy Lake to the north, which forms part of the international border with Ontario.

The forest's level terrain and abundance of lowland sites are due to the influence of Glacial Lake Agassiz in the area. Tree species predominantly include lowland species such as black spruce, northern whitecedar, and tamarack, although aspen and pine are present in the scattered upland sites.

Recreation
Popular outdoor recreational activities are largely centered on the forest's access to Rainy Lake, the Little Fork River, and the Big Fork River, and include boating, canoeing, kayaking, and fishing. Picnicking and dispersed camping are possible throughout the forest. Trails are designated for hiking, snowmobiling, and  set aside specifically for cross-country skiing.

See also
List of Minnesota state forests

References

External links
Koochicing State Forest - Minnesota Department of Natural Resources (DNR)

Minnesota state forests
Protected areas of Itasca County, Minnesota
Protected areas of Koochiching County, Minnesota
Protected areas of St. Louis County, Minnesota
Protected areas established in 1943